"Love" is a song by Canadian music duo Lennon & Maisy. They recorded the song for a Coop Naturaplan TV commercial. The song reached number two in Switzerland for three consecutive weeks.

Charts

Weekly charts

Year-end charts

References

2014 singles
2014 songs